The Main Ingredient is a 1995 album by Shirley Horn.

Reception 

The AllMusic review by Scott Yanow said: "This Shirley Horn CD is a little unusual, as it was recorded at her home. The four sessions utilized some of her favorite musicians... As usual, virtually all of the songs are taken at slow tempos, with 'All or Nothing at All' given a definitive treatment". The Penguin Guide to Jazz commented that the guest musicians added variety, but that the best track was the trio rendition of "The Look of Love".

Track listing 
 "Blues for Sarge" (Ronald R. Dawson) – 4:16
 "The Look of Love" (Burt Bacharach, Hal David) – 5:22
 "Keepin' Out of Mischief Now" (Andy Razaf, Fats Waller) – 3:46
 "The Meaning of the Blues" (Bobby Troup, Leah Worth) – 7:55
 "Here's Looking at You" (Carroll Coates) – 3:27
 "You Go to My Head" (John Frederick Coots, Haven Gillespie) – 9:08
 "Fever" (Eddie Cooley, John Davenport) – 4:42
 "Come in from the Rain" (Melissa Manchester, Carole Bayer Sager) – 4:50
 "Peel Me a Grape" (Dave Frishberg) – 2:55
 "All or Nothing at All" (Arthur Altman, Jack Lawrence) – 7:10

Personnel 
 Shirley Horn – piano, vocals
 Joe Henderson – tenor saxophone
 Buck Hill
 Roy Hargrove – flugelhorn
 Charles Ables – guitar, electric bass
 Steve Novosel – double bass
 Billy Hart – drums
 Elvin Jones – drums
 Steve Williams – drums

References 

1996 albums
Shirley Horn albums
Verve Records albums